Saint-Léon-sur-Vézère (literally Saint-Léon on Vézère) is a commune in the Dordogne department in Nouvelle-Aquitaine in southwestern France.

Population

Views

See also
Communes of the Dordogne department

References

Communes of Dordogne
Plus Beaux Villages de France